Maurice Delvart (21 September 1899 – 24 December 1986) was a French sprinter who specialised in the 400 metres. He competed at the 1920 Summer Olympics in the 400 m and 4 × 400 m relay and won a bronze medal in the relay. Nationally Delvart finished second in the 400 m in 1919, 1920 and 1922. He set a world record over 500 m.

References

1899 births
1986 deaths
French male sprinters
Olympic bronze medalists for France
Athletes (track and field) at the 1920 Summer Olympics
Olympic athletes of France
Medalists at the 1920 Summer Olympics
Olympic bronze medalists in athletics (track and field)
Sportspeople from Pas-de-Calais
19th-century French people
20th-century French people